Konderan or Kandaran or Kondoran may refer to:
 Kandaran, Fars
 Konderan, Hormozgan